The Kinpai (in Japanese: 金盃), is a race for four-year-olds in the Special Ward Horse Racing Association.

Race Details

It is held at Ohi Racecourse and is 2,600 meters in length on a dirt track.

The race is usually run in February.

Winners since 2015

Winners since 2015 include:

Past winners

Past winners include:

See also
 Horse racing in Japan
 List of Japanese flat horse races

References

Horse races in Japan